"Over" is a single released by High and Mighty Color on April 20, 2005.

Overview
"Over" is the band's single. It was previously released under their independent label, and was known as the "Phantom Single", because only 2,000 copies were made. "Over" was used as the theme song for the TV show "Matthew's Best Hit TV Plus".

Track list
 "OVER" – 4:02
 "change" – 3:34
  – 4:40
 "OVER (Instrumental)" – 4:03

All songs written by HIGH and MIGHTY COLOR.

Personnel
 Maakii & Yuusuke — vocals
 Kazuto — guitar
 MEG — guitar
 maCKAz — bass
 SASSY — drums

Charts
Oricon Sales Chart (Japan)

References

2005 singles
Over
2005 songs